COBRA 10s is the world's premier rugby tens tournament which is organized annually by the COBRA Rugby Club of Malaysia. The tournament is held each November at the MBPJ Stadium in Petaling Jaya, Malaysia.

The first COBRA 10s tournament was held in 1967. Today, 16 top teams from around the world compete for the coveted Hui Weng Chun Challenge Trophy and title as Tens champion.

HSBC Bank, a name globally recognised and synonymous with rugby had been the tournament's main sponsor from 2005 to 2012. Since 2013 COBRA has been organizing the tournament without a title sponsor but with the assistance two main sponsors; Carlsberg Marketing Malaysia and IJM Corporation Berhad. The club has also been supported by many other sponsors.

Overview

A Tens game lasts 20 minutes except for the final, which lasts 30 minutes. Played fast and furious, it is an exciting variation of the popular game of rugby Sevens but more closely related to the rugby Fifteens format. The Tens allows both forward and back line play. The key factor here is all-round skills are translated into teamwork at fast pace.

Yearly, a total of 16 top teams from all over the world are invited to participate in this prestigious tournament which is played over two days.

History
Although Malaysia may seem an unlikely place for the making of rugby history, yet it was here that 10-a-side rugby was born. The world's first 10 a-side rugby tournament was held in Malaysia in 1967. The Tens tournament was indeed a brainchild of a menagerie of Combined Old Boys Rugby Association (COBRA) members. The Tens game was conceived on the barstools of their favourite after match haunt. The idea was to create a format of play that is fast and open but still retains much of the character of the 15s version.

Early years

The COBRA 10s in its early years was mainly contested by local clubs and several invited foreign teams. The tournament was keenly contested between the expatriate- dominated Royal Selangor Club and COBRA. Then the military took over. First the Royal Australian Artillery Regiment, then the 16th and then 1st Royal New Zealand Infantry Regiment (RNZIR) made the 10s their own - except for brief interruptions by COBRA in 1972 and 1975.  The RNZIR in fact won it for seven straight years until most of them were shipped back to New Zealand, thus allowing the curiously named Bunnies to take the title in 1985. The Police took it for two years in a row but the stragglers of the RNZIR, in their final year in Malaysia, wrested the trophy for one last time.

Recent events
In 1992, the COBRA Tens went fully international. That year Australian champions, Randwick of Sydney, defeated a very strong Marist St. Joseph of Samoa in a thoroughly fascinating encounter . For the first time, rugby luminaries, namely Lawrence Dallaglio (former England captain), Australian hooker, and later captain, Phil Kearns, and All Black Olo Brown played on Malaysian soil. Subsequent tournaments have featured internationals such as Tony Underwood (England), Waisale Serevi (Fiji), Brian Lima (Samoa), Uale Mai (Samoa), Amasio Valence (New Zealand) among many other notable names in rugby. Belgium Barbarians was invited in 2007.

Venue

The inaugural COBRA 10s tournament was held at the Astaka Field in Petaling Jaya in 1967 and during the tournament's early years, the Astaka field became the home of the Tens.

When the first fully international version of the COBRA 10s was introduced in 1992, the Kuala Lumpur Stadium in Cheras became the new home of the Tens and for subsequent tournaments till 1997.

Since then the COBRA 10s is held annually at the MBPJ Stadium in Petaling Jaya, Malaysia.   The stadium, which was built in preparation for the 1998 Commonwealth Games, was also the venue for the Commonwealth Games Rugby Sevens. The COBRA 10s was brought back to the Astaka field in Petaling Jaya for brief moments in 1998 and 2009.

Tournament format

Grouping of teams
16 teams will be grouped into four groups of four.

Day 1 - Preliminary round

The Preliminary Rounds shall be played in accordance with a round robin format. Each team shall play three matches against teams within their group.

Points will be awarded as follows :
 WIN - Two Points
 DRAW - One Point
 WALKOVER - Two Points
 LOSS - Zero (0) Points

Day 2 - Knockout round

In the second round, the two top teams in each group will advance to the Cup/Plate Championship Pool.

The 3rd and 4th placed teams in each group will advance to the Bowl Championship pool.

Cup Championship pool

Quarter-finals :

The winners in the Cup Championship pool will advance to the Cup Semi Finals (while the losers will advance to the Plate Semi Finals).

 A1 vs B2
 B1 vs A2
 C1 vs D2
 D1 vs C2

Cup Semi Finals :

Semi finals shall be played on a knock-out system

 Winner A1-B2 vs Winner C1-D2
 Winner A2-B1 vs Winner C2-D1

Plate Championship pool

The losers of the Cup/Plate Quarter Finals will advance to the Plate Semi Finals.

Semi Finals :

Semi finals shall be played on a knock-out system

 Loser A1-B2 vs Loser C1-D2
 Loser A2-B1 vs Loser C2-D1

Bowl Championship pool

Quarter-finals :

Quarter Finals will be played on a knock-out basis.

 A3 vs B4
 B3 vs A4
 C3 vs D4
 D3 vs C4

Bowl Semi Finals :

Semi finals shall be played on a knock-out system.

 Winner A3-B4 vs Winner C3-D4
 Winner A4-B3 vs Winner C4-D3

Development activities
During the week of the tournament, rugby development activities are conducted with the assistance from participating teams. 
Among the activities organised are : 
 Rugby coaching clinics for schoolboys
 Referees seminar
 Rugby friendlies with local teams

Past champions

References

Rugby union competitions in Malaysia
Rugby tens